The Pishan hostage crisis occurred on the night of December 28, 2011, in Koxtag (Kuoshi Tage), Pishan/Guma County, Hotan Prefecture, Xinjiang Uygur Autonomous Region, China. A group of 15 Uyghur youths kidnapped two goat shepherds for directions. They were soon confronted by a group of five Pishan policemen, who tried to negotiate for the shepherds' release. The group attacked the policemen with knives, killing one and injuring another. The police shot back, killing seven hostage-takers, wounding and capturing four, freeing the two shepherds. The Xinjiang government called the kidnappers "violent terrorists", while a Uyghur exile group claimed the kidnappers' actions were the result of "police repression".

Background 

Pishan County is one of the poorest counties in the Xinjiang region, on the southern edge of the Taklamakan Desert bordering Pakistan's Azad Kashmir. An oasis county, its people are predominantly cotton-growers. Han Chinese account for less than 2% of the population of Pishan. Residents of Pishan told Xinhua that a new spirit of extremism was damaging organized Uyghur life. Earlier in the month, religious extremists kidnapped and murdered a Uyghur man for drinking alcohol, which is prohibited in Islam. Store-owners in Pishan who sell alcoholic drinks and cigarettes said that they feared retaliation by extremists.

The ethnic Uyghur-dominated southern part of Xinjiang has witnessed increasing separatist violence by Uyghurs who want to establish an independent state. On April 18 and 21, there were two fatal incidents of Uyghurs stabbing Han Chinese in the city of Kashgar. In July, Uyghur attackers seized a police station, threatened hostages, and battled police in a standoff that would ultimately end in 18 deaths. In that same month, a group of Pakistan-trained Uyghur youths killed 14 people in a vehicular, IED and knife attack in Kashgar.

Events 

A Chinese state-run tabloid, The Global Times, cited a local official speaking on condition of anonymity as claiming that a party of 15 young men and their wives en route to Pakistani jihadist camps became lost near the mountainous areas of Pishan. Around 11 pm (1500 GMT) on December 28, they kidnapped two Uyghur goat shepherds in the town of Kuoshi Tage (Qoshtagh) and forced the shepherds to act as their guides. The kidnapping was witnessed by several workers at the Kuoshi Tage agricultural cooperative. Five police officers, led by Pishan deputy police chief Adil Abduveli, tried to persuade the party to abandon their plans, while negotiating for the shepherds' release. The party instead argued with the police, and when Abduveli touched one of the men's wives, a kidnapper stabbed Abdulveli to death and injured another police officer. According to local residents, the remaining police officers then opened fire, killing seven kidnappers and detaining four, who are charged with resisting arrest. The two hostages were freed, unharmed. The government did not announce the ethnicity of the kidnappers, except to say that they were ethnic minorities; Pishan residents interviewed by Radio Free Asia (RFA) confirmed that they were Uyghurs. The village chief of one of the  hamlets unofficially claimed to identify two of the seven shot as Ablikim Abduqadir and Hebibulla Abduqadir. Hebibulla Abduqadir had taken a class taken three months prior in Artux which was considered an illegal religious activity.

Reactions 
World Uyghur Congress spokesperson Dilxadi Rexiti (also known as Dilxat Raxit) said on December 29 that the hostage-takers were "angry" that police had searched private homes for Islamic extremist material, explaining the police attack as a matter of "the local Uighur people [not being able to] take the pressure anymore." Rexiti also questioned the death toll, claiming that his "sources" reported deaths of nine or ten among the kidnappers, not seven. On the other hand, Xinjiang government spokeswoman Hou Hanmin said that the kidnappers were "violent terrorists". No more details on the kidnappers have been released as the police are investigating the incident. On December 31, CPC party chief of Xinjiang Zhang Chunxian pledged to "safeguard regional stability" and to enlist the Xinjiang public in the fight against "foreign religious infiltration" and "organized terrorist attacks".

References 

Police officers killed in the line of duty
Terrorist incidents in China in 2011
Terrorist incidents in China
Islamic terrorism in China
Islamic terrorist incidents in 2011
21st century in Xinjiang
2011 murders in China
Terrorist incidents involving knife attacks
Kidnappings in China
Xinjiang conflict
Hostage taking in China